Dryburgh is a surname. Notable people with the surname include:

Dave Dryburgh (1908–1948), Scotland-born Canadian sports journalist
Douglas Dryburgh (born 1966), Scottish-Irish curler
Jack Dryburgh (born 1939), British ice hockey player and coach
James Dryburgh (born 1975), Scottish-Swedish curler
Margaret Dryburgh (1890–1945), missionary
Stuart Dryburgh (born 1952), New Zealand cinematographer
Willie Dryburgh (1876–1951), Scottish footballer